is a professor at the Graduate School of Information Science, Nara Institute of Science and Technology, Japan. He is also an honorary professor at Karlsruhe Institute of Technology, Germany.

Nakamura's current research interests include speech-to-speech translation, speech recognition, speech synthesis, spoken dialog systems, multi-modal communication, and brain activity sensing in linguistics.

Education and professional career
1981:       B.S. from Kyoto Institute of Technology 
1992:       Ph.D. from Kyoto University 
1994–2000:  Associate professor of Graduate School of Information Science at Nara Institute of Science and Technology 
2000–2008:  Director of ATR Spoken Language Communication Research Laboratories 
2007–2008:  Vice-president of ATR
2009–2010:  Director-General of Keihanna Research Laboratories and executive director of Knowledge Creating Communication Research Center, National Institute of Information and Communications Technology, Japan
Current: Director of Augmented Human Communication Laboratory and full professor of Graduate School of Information Science at Nara Institute of Science and Technology.

References

External links
Augmented Human Communication Laboratory, Graduate School of Information Science, Nara Institute of Science and Technology
Nara Institute of Science and Technology
Publication list

External links

Japanese scientists
Academic staff of Nara Institute of Science and Technology
Living people
Kyoto University alumni
Year of birth missing (living people)